The Silver Peak Range is a mountain range in southwest Esmeralda County, Nevada, United States.

Geography
The Range forms the east and southeast side of Fish Lake Valley. The towering White Mountains lie across the valley to the west and southwest. The Palmetto Mountains are to the south.

Piper Peak, Red Mountain, and Emigrant Peak are in the range.

References

External Resources 
 R.C. Root, Anthony & Co, "Map Of Nevada Showing New Discoveries Of Silver Peak," 1865.

Mountain ranges of Nevada
Mountain ranges of Esmeralda County, Nevada 
Mountain ranges of the Great Basin